Agga Thiri Maya Dewi was a principal queen consort of King Binnya Ran II of Hanthawaddy. According to the Pak Lat Chronicles, she was the chief queen of the king in 1495. She presumably became the chief queen at her husband's accession in 1492 but the exact duration of her reign is not known.

Notes

References

Bibliography
 

Chief queens consort of Hanthawaddy
Burmese people of Mon descent
16th-century Burmese women
15th-century Burmese women